The East Bohemia Tour is a staged cycling race held annually in the Olomouc region in the Czech Republic. It was created in 2015 and is part of the UCI Europe Tour in category 2.2.

Winners

References

Cycle races in the Czech Republic
Recurring sporting events established in 2015
2015 establishments in the Czech Republic
UCI Europe Tour races
Defunct cycling races in the Czech Republic